Speedball, powerball, or over and under, is an umbrella term used to describe the polydrug mixture of a stimulant with a depressant.

Common stimulants and depressant used for recreational drug use include cocaine or amphetamine with heroin, morphine, and/or fentanyl that may be taken intravenously or by nasal insufflation.

Speedballs often give stronger effects than either drug when taken alone due to drug synergy, and are considered a particularly hazardous mixture that can easily cause heart attack, respiratory arrest and death. Evidence suggests that when compared to single drugs, speedballs are more likely to lead to addiction, and users are more likely to relapse and also to overdose.

History
Original speedball combinations used methamphetamine mixed with heroin, or cocaine hydrochloride mixed with morphine sulfate.

Alcohol and barbiturates used to be common, when barbiturates were more readily available.

Physiological response
Cocaine acts as a stimulant, whereas heroin/morphine acts as a depressant. Co-administration is meant to provide an intense rush of euphoria with a high that is supposed to combine the effects of both drugs, while hoping to reduce the negative effects, such as the anxiety, hypertension and palpitations associated with stimulants, and sedation/drowsiness from the depressant. While this can be somewhat effective, there is an imperfect overlap in the effects of stimulants and depressants. Some users report a higher rush and better comedown, and others report displeasure at the drugs effectively cancelling each other out.

By suppressing the typical negative side effects of the two drugs, the user may falsely believe they have a higher tolerance, or that they are less intoxicated than they actually are. This can cause users to misjudge the intake of one or both of the drugs, resulting in a fatal overdose. Cocaine's stimulating effects also cause the body to use more oxygen, while the depressant effects of heroin slow breathing rates. This combination significantly increases the chance of experiencing respiratory depression or respiratory failure, which may become fatal.

Super speedballs
The United States Drug Enforcement Administration warned in 2019 that the rapid rise of fentanyl supply in the country has led to combinations of both fentanyl and heroin with cocaine ("super speedballs"). In addition, the cross-contamination of powdered fentanyl into cocaine supplies has led to reports of cocaine users unknowingly consuming a speedball-like combination.

Notable deaths attributed to speedball use
Jean-Michel Basquiat, though other sources list his death as heroin overdose only.
John Belushi
Ken Caminiti
Chris Farley
Pete Farndon
Zac Foley
Trevor Goddard
Mitch Hedberg
Philip Seymour Hoffman
Sebastian Horsley
DJ Rashad
Chris Kelly
Brent Mydland
River Phoenix
Judee Sill
Layne Staley
Joey Stefano, died from mixing cocaine, morphine, heroin and ketamine.
Michael K. Williams, died of overdose of a mixture of fentanyl-laced heroin and cocaine.

Notable incidents of use
In 1996, Steven Adler had a stroke after taking a speedball, leaving him with a permanent speech impediment. That same year, Dave Gahan suffered a heart attack following a speedball overdose, but survived. According to his autobiography, Slash experienced cardiac arrest for eight minutes after taking a speedball, but was revived.

See also
Brompton cocktail
Combined drug intoxication
Drug abuse
List of deaths from drug overdose and intoxication
List of polysubstance combinations
Poly drug use

References

External links 

Cocaine
Euphoriants
Stimulants
Heroin
Polysubstance combinations